Pellegrino Luigi Odoardo Rossi  (13 July 1787 – 15 November 1848) was an Italian economist, politician and jurist. He was an important figure of the July Monarchy in France, and the minister of justice in the government of the Papal States, under Pope Pius IX.

Biography
Rossi was born in Carrara, then under the Duchy of Massa and Carrara. Educated at the University of Pisa and the University of Bologna, he became professor of law at the latter in 1812. In 1815 he gave his support to Joachim Murat and his Neapolitan anti-Austrian expedition: after the latter's fall, he escaped to France, and then proceeded to Geneva, where he began teaching a course of jurisprudence applied to Roman law, the success of which gained him the unusual honour of naturalization as a citizen of Geneva. In 1820 he was elected as a deputy to the cantonal council, and was a member of the diet of 1832; Rossi was entrusted with the task of drawing up a revised constitution, which was known as the Pacte Rossi. This was rejected by a majority of the diet, a result which deeply affected Rossi, and made him accept the invitation of François Guizot to settle in France.

Here he was appointed in 1833 to the chair of political economy in the Collège de France, vacated by the death of Jean-Baptiste Say. He was naturalized as a French citizen in 1834, and in the same year became professor of constitutional law in the faculty of law of the Paris University. In 1836 he was elected a member of the Academy of Political and Moral Sciences, was raised to the French peerage in 1839, and in 1843 became dean of the faculty of law.

In 1842 Rossi and Count Ferdinand-Charles-Philippe d' Esterno (1805–83) organized the first meetings of what would become the Société d'économie politique.

In 1845, Guizot appointed Rossi as ambassador of France to the Papal States, with a specific mission to discuss the question of the Jesuits. However, the French Revolution of 1848 toppled Guizot's regime, and the revolution in Italy fully severed Rossi's connection with France. Rossi thus remained at Rome, and there became Minister of the Interior under Pope Pius IX. Rossi's program of liberal reforms, however, was never put into practice. Rossi's program of moderate liberalism, in which suffrage was to be limited to the well-off and the economic and social disruptions created by industrialization went unaddressed, had narrow appeal. Rossi attempts to mediate reform, were blocked by the reactionary clerical party, and rebuffed as paltry by the rising revolutionary sentiment. In addition, the notion of a united Italy as a federation, kingdom, or republic was proposed by the diverse forces; however some of these ideas clearly threatened the temporal power of various rulers.

On 15 November 1848, Rossi was going to preside of the opening of the Parliament in the Palazzo della Cancelleria. After exiting his carriage and walking towards the entrance, he was killed by an assassin who stabbed him in the neck. The pope seeing the inevitable imposition of democracy for his state, fled from Rome, and leading to the proclamation of the Roman Republic.

The murderer was said to be Luigi Brunetti, the elder son of Angelo Brunetti (or Ciceruacchio), who acted at the instigation of Pietro Sterbini, and with the cooperation of some veterans or reduci of the conflict in Lombardy. After the murder, the senate adjourned without much sorrow, and little to no attention to the murder victim. That night crowds at the house of Rossi's widow chanted Blessed is the hand that stabbed the Rossi. Sterbini went on to play a prominent role in the Roman Republic in 1849, but fled into exile after its fall, until 1861. In a trial held in 1854, a man by the name of Gabriele Constantini was convicted and executed.

The city of Carrara erected a statue in honor of Pellegrino Rossi.

Selected works
Cours d'économie politique (1838–54)
Traité de droit pénal (1829)
Cours de droit constitutionnel (1866–67)
Melanges d'économie politique, d'histoire et de philosophie (1857, 2 volumes)

References

Claudio Rendina, Enciclopedia di Roma, Newton Compton, Rome, 1994

1787 births
1848 deaths
Deaths by stabbing in Rome
People from Carrara
University of Pavia alumni
University of Bologna alumni
Italian economists
Italian politicians
Italian emigrants to France
Naturalized citizens of France
Academic staff of the Collège de France
Members of the Chamber of Peers of the July Monarchy
People of the Revolutions of 1848
History of the Papal States
Italian people of the Italian unification
Assassinated Italian politicians
Members of the Académie des sciences morales et politiques
Burials at San Lorenzo in Damaso